Dylan Holmes Williams (born in December 1992) is a British film director and screenwriter based in London.

Biography 
His first short film, The Nightmare on Deskteeth Street, premiered at BFI London Film Festival 2017.

In 2020, his second short film The Devil’s Harmony won the Jury Prize for International Fiction at Sundance Film Festival. In 2019, it won the Best UK Short Jury Prize at Raindance Film Festival, a Best Director award at Fantastic Fest, British / Irish Short Film of the Year at the London Film Critics Circle Awards and was nominated for a British Independent Film Award (BIFA) for Best British Short Film. In 2021, it was acquired by the Criterion Channel.

His third short film, Stilts, directed in 2019, was programmed by Film4 & Channel 4. It aired on Channel 4 in the UK and later before previews of Robert Eggers’ The Lighthouse at UK cinemas. Its North American premiere was at Slamdance Film Festival 2021.

In 2021, he directed two episodes of the third season of M. Night Shyamalan's Apple TV+ show Servant, followed by two episodes of the fourth season.

Filmography

Film

Television

Music videos

References

External links 
 
 Official website of Dylan Holmes Williams
 The Devil's Harmony (Full Film) on Vimeo

Living people
Sundance Film Festival award winners
British film directors
British screenwriters
Year of birth missing (living people)